Nathan Masters (born 1981) is a writer, Los Angeles historian, and host of Lost L.A., a public television series about Los Angeles history. He manages public programs at the University of Southern California Libraries. In 2013, he launched a Gizmodo subdomain titled Southland about Los Angeles history and geography. Masters grew up in Orange County, California.

He has hosted the public television series Lost L.A. since its conception in 2016 and has also served as a producer. The series, originally based on a series of articles he wrote for KCET, has won multiple awards, including four Los Angeles Area Emmys and a Golden Mike.

In 2019, the digital magazine Truly*Adventurous published his article "Pillars of Fire" about Los Angeles policewoman Alice Stebbins Wells and cult leader Alma Bridwell White. Amazon Studios subsequently acquired the story, with Rachel Brosnahan attached. Masters published later another story with Truly*Adventurous about Soviet spy and FBI counterspy Boris Morros. In November 2020 he announced that he had sold a book, titled Crooked, about "the most corrupt attorney general in U.S. history and the senator who took him down" to Hachette Books.

External links

References

1981 births
Living people
American writers